Robert Walsh (fl. 1417–1435), of Lincoln, was an English politician.

He was a Member (MP) of the Parliament of England for Lincoln in 
1417, December 1421, 1422, 1425, 1426, 1427, 1429, 1431, 1433 and 1435.

References

14th-century births
15th-century deaths
English MPs 1417
Members of the Parliament of England (pre-1707) for Lincoln
English MPs December 1421
English MPs 1422
English MPs 1425
English MPs 1426
English MPs 1427
English MPs 1429
English MPs 1431
English MPs 1433
English MPs 1435